The 1981 Toyota Superdiesels season was the seventh season of the franchise in the Philippine Basketball Association (PBA).

Colors
For the Open Conference:
  (dark)
  (light)
For the Reinforced All-Filipino:
   (dark)
   (light)

Summary
Former Royal Tru-Orange coach Ed Ocampo is the new head coach of Toyota now with a new moniker "Superdiesels". Import Andrew Fields is on his third year of duty, teaming up with Melton Wertz. The Superdiesels lost to Crispa, 97–112, in the opening day on March 8.  After four games, Melton Wertz was replaced by Victor King. The Superdiesels were the last team to enter the four-team semifinal round. Toyota finished with an impressive five wins and one loss slate in the semifinals and will play arch rival Crispa Redmanizers in the Open Conference finals.

The championship series between Toyota and Crispa will be the 10th and what turned out to be the final time the two rivals meet in the finale. The Superdiesels won the series opener, but lost the next two games and trailed 1–2 against Crispa and on a verge of another disappointing finish. The Superdiesels won Game Four to forced a deciding match. 

On July 25 with a huge turnout of fans on hand to witness the final game of the series to be officiated by two NBA referees, Jim Capers and Lee Jones, Toyota won over Crispa, 103-97, Andrew Fields' three-point play in the last one minute and twenty seconds of the game turned out to be the winning basket for the Superdiesels. Center Ramon Fernandez was the top local scorer for his team, averaging 23 points per game and posting his highest output in Game two with 29 big points and tallying 20 points in Game five.

Toyota had the smallest of imports due to the handicap ruling in the Reinforced Filipino Conference in 6-0 Archie Talley. The Superdiesels were tied with Crispa on top of the one-round elimination phase. 

In the round of six, the Superdiesels lost their first two matches against the Redmanizers, 110–111,  and U-Tex Wranglers, 121–125. They were booted out of contention by Yco-Tanduay after suffering their third loss in four games at the hands of the Esquires. It marks the first time in seven seasons and 20 conferences that Toyota failed to advance in the semifinal round.

Occurrences
After back-to-back wins at the start of the semifinal round in the Open Conference, the Toyota Superdiesels went down to its first setback as they bowed to Crispa, 118–133 on July 7. The Superdiesels were seemingly affected by the shocking news a day earlier upon learning the death of their former coach Fort Acuña. The team showed up in their red uniforms with a piece of black cloth attached to their jerseys as a sign of mourning to the demise of their former coach.

Award
Andrew Fields became the first recipient of the PBA Best Import Award when he powered Toyota to the Open Conference championship.

Won-loss record vs Opponents

Roster

References

Toyota
Toyota Super Corollas seasons